The Islamic Democratic League is a Bangladeshi political party.

History
The Islamic Democratic League was established in 1976 by Maulana Abdur Rahim. The party had former members of Bangladesh Jamaat-e-Islami. Following the Independence of Bangladesh, religion based political parties, like Bangladesh Jamaat-e-Islami, were banned. In the 1979 election, for the 2nd Jatiya Sangsad, six members of the party were elected to Parliament. The same year the government of Bangladesh revoked the ban on religion based parties which legalized Jamaat-e-Islami. Many members of Islamic Democratic League returned to their former party.

References

 
Political parties in Bangladesh
Far-right politics in Bangladesh